Dag Ringsson was a Norwegian chieftain from Oppland who participated in the Battle of Stiklestad during 1030 which resulted in the death of King Olaf II of Norway

According to Snorri Sturluson, Dag Ringsson was a descendant of Harald Fairhair. His family had settled in Sweden, where Dag was a nobleman at the service of Swedish King Anund Jacob. 

In 1026, King Olaf II of Norway and King Anund Jacob had lost the Battle of the Helgeå.  This left King Cnut the Great of Denmark as the dominant leader in Scandinavia. By 1029 the Norwegian nobles, seething with discontent, rallied round the invading King Cnut forcing Olaf to flee. During his exile, King Olaf stayed some time in Sweden in the province of Närke with Sigtrygg of Nerike. While in Sweden, King Olaf was able to recruit Dag and his manpower to his project of recapturing control of Norway.

According to the Saga of Saint Olaf as recorded by Snorri Sturluson  in  the Heimskringla, Dag Ringsson was a member of King Olaf's army at the Battle of Stiklestad (Slaget på Stiklestad) in 1030. After King Olaf had fallen at Stiklestad, Dag led his forces into battle (Dagsriden). However, the peasant army soon overwhelmed the remnants of the king's men. Dag and his followers fled back to Sweden. Mention of Dag Ringsson did not appear after this point.

References

People from Oppland
11th-century Norwegian nobility
Norwegian exiles